Saint-Parize-le-Châtel is a commune in the Nièvre département in central France.

The Circuit de Nevers Magny-Cours, a famous motor racing circuit that hosts the Formula One French Grand Prix, is located in the communes of Magny-Cours and Saint-Parize-le-Châtel.

History
The area was evangelised in the 6th century by Patricius (Saint Patrice), a monk after whom the village was named. Before that, the place was known as Gentilico, Gentiliaco or Gentilly.

During the French Revolution, Saint-Parize-le-Châtel was renamed Brenery for some months.

Sights and monuments
 Château de Villars: 14th century castle, parts of which have been listed since 1951 as a monument historique by the French Ministry of Culture.
 Église Saint-Patrice (St Patrick's Church): the 12th century church and its crypt have been listed as a monument historique since 1862.
 Château de la Chasseigne: 15th century manor house.
 Château de Tâche: 16th century hunting lodge
 Château de Lange: fortified house whose origin was a small 12th century castle. The present structure dates from the 15th century.
 Les Fonts-Bouillants: sparkling water springs, exploited commercially between 1895 and 1975.
 Fontaine des vertus: spring in forest, from the same origin as the Fonts-Bouillants. The water is frequently bouillonnante (bubbling), caused by the release of carbon dioxide. According to local legend, Joan of Arc washed her sword in it after liberating Saint-Pierre-le-Moûtier in 1429.

See also
Communes of the Nièvre department

References

External links

 
 

Communes of Nièvre